Noangel Luaces (born 30 March 1957) is a Cuban basketball player. He competed in the men's tournament at the 1980 Summer Olympics.

References

1957 births
Living people
Cuban men's basketball players
Olympic basketball players of Cuba
Basketball players at the 1980 Summer Olympics
Place of birth missing (living people)